Anopheles (Anopheles) peditaeniatus is a species complex of mosquito belonging to the genus Anopheles, of the Hyrcanus Group. It is found in India, and Sri Lanka, Iran, and Bangladesh. It is a potential natural vector of bancroftian filariasis in Sri Lanka.

References

External links
Confirmation of Anopheles peditaeniatus and Anopheles sundaicus as Malaria Vectors (Diptera: Culicidae) in Sungai Nyamuk Village, Sebatik Island North Kalimantan, Indonesia Using an Enzyme-Linked Immunosorbent Assay
Seasonal abundance of Anopheles mosquitoes and their association with meteorological factors and malaria incidence in Bangladesh

peditaeniatus
Insects described in 1908